Erik Dwi Ermawansyah (19 April 1996 – 25 January 2019) was an Indonesian professional football player who was a forward for Liga 1 club PSIS Semarang. 
He played mainly at forward but also operated as a defender.

Career

Persebaya Surabaya
Dwi Ermawansyah was a player from Persebaya Surabaya juniors with Evan Dimas, before Erik's promotion to the senior team of Persebaya Surabaya.

PSIS Semarang
In 2017, Dwi Ermawansyah joined PSIS Semarang to play in the 2017 Liga 2. According to the General Manager of PSIS, Wahyu Winarto, Dwi Ermawansyah was brought in to strengthen the defense. Erik would have joined Persiba Balikpapan, but eventually the loan was cancelled when the management of Persiba Balikpapan got word that Dwi Ermawansyah was not under contract with Madura United.

References

External links
Erik Dwi Ermawansyah at Soccerway

1996 births
2019 deaths
Indonesian footballers
Sportspeople from Surabaya
Bhayangkara F.C. players
Madura United F.C. players
PSIS Semarang players
Liga 1 (Indonesia) players
Association football forwards
Association football defenders